Haley Moss is an attorney, contemporary American pop art artist, author and advocate for people with disabilities.  Diagnosed at age three with high-functioning autism, she has been recognized by Project Lifesaver,  University of Miami, Dan Marino Foundation, "Hope for Children"  and Council for Exceptional Children (CEC) for her efforts, talents and philanthropy.

Moss attended the Pine Crest School in Fort Lauderdale, Florida., holds a Bachelor of Science in Psychology and a Bachelor of Arts in Criminology from the University of Florida, a Miami Scholar and a Juris Doctor from the University of Miami School of Law.

On January 11, 2019, she was admitted to the Florida bar as a professionally licensed attorney and the first openly autistic female attorney in the State of Florida.

Publications / Awards
 Paperback "A Freshman Survival Guide for College Students with Autism Spectrum Disorders: The Stuff Nobody Tells You About!", (2014) Jessica Kingsley Publishing,  
 Paperback "Middle School: The Stuff Nobody Tells You About", (2010) AAPC Publishing, 
 DisAbilities Expo "Outstanding Leadership Award", Broward County, FL, October, 2010
 Unicorn Foundation "Award for Continuous and Generous Support", Boca Raton, Florida., March, 2011
 WXEL TV and the Garnet Society "Future Women with Wings and Wisdom" award recipient at Mar-A-Lago, Palm Beach, FL., March, 2011
 MAAP Services, "Art Across the Spectrum Star of Hope Award", Bradenton/Sarasota, FL., March, 2011
 Council for Exceptional Children (CEC) "Yes I Can!" International Award in the Arts, Washington, D.C., April, 2011
 Project Lifesaver International "Ambassador", Palm Beach Gardens, FL., April, 2011
 Samsung "Hope for Children" 10th Anniversary "Teen Hero" honoree, Cipriani, New York, NY., June, 2011
 Prudential Spirit of Community Award, Distinguished Finalist, State of Florida, February, 2012
 President's Volunteer Service Award, February, 2012
 Blogher Voices of the Year Honoree, July, 2016
 "Haley Moss Appreciation Day" Proclamation, Broward County, Florida, June 26, 2012
 "Gators of Tomorrow" Top 25 Freshman at the University of Florida, April, 2013
 Unicorn Foundation "Young Leaders in Philanthropy Award" October, 2012
 University of Florida Anderson Scholar,  September, 2014
 Birch Family Services "Voices of Hope Award Honoree" New York, NY, May 2018
 Unicorn Children's Foundation "Youth in Service Award" February, 2019
 Alumni Leadership Award, University of Miami School of Law Society of Bar & Gavel, April 2019
 "Autism Spectrum Award Els for Autism", Oct 2019
 "Hiring neurodiverse people like me can give companies a competitive advantage", Washington Post, Oct 2019

Projects / Events
 Contributing Artist, University of Miami/Nova Southeastern University CARD, 2009–2012
 Panel Speaker, Books and Books, March, 2010
 Event Feature Artist," Walk About Autism", Dan Marino Foundation, January, 2011
 Event Feature Artist, "Project Hope",
 Event Feature Artist, Unicorn Foundation, March, 2011
 Event Artist, Making Autistic Strides "Melody of Hope" concert, March, 2011
 Event Feature Artist and "Teen Hero" honoree, Samsung "Hope For Children" charity fundraiser, New York City, June, 2011
 Event Feature Artist, City of Boca Raton "Art in Public Places", September, 2011
 Event Panel Speaker, "Transitions:2012" Conference, Lynn University, Boca Raton, Florida, January, 2012
 Event Feature Artist," 2nd Annual Walk About Autism", Sun Life Stadium, Dan Marino Foundation, Miami, Florida, January, 2012
 Event Contributing Artist, Unicorn Foundation, February, 2012
 Event Feature Artist, University of Miami/Nova Southeastern University CARD "Tropical Nights" 10th Anniversary fundraiser, May, 2012
 Event Feature Artist, Council for Exceptional Children (CEC) Florida, October, 2012
 Event Panel Speaker, "Transitions:2013" Conference, Lynn University, Boca Raton, Florida, February, 2013
 Event Contributing Artist and Supporter, Unicorn Foundation, March, 2013
 Coral Gables Police Department Co-Host "The Wallet Card for Autism Spectrum Disorder Residents", February 2015
 Contributing writer, "The Huffington Post", October 2015 to present
 Student Commencement Speaker, University of Miami School of Law Class of 2018, May 2018 University of Miami School of Law Commencement Ceremony on Livestream
 2018 Community Inclusion Award Publix Self-Advocate of the Year, Special Needs Advisory Coalition/Unicorn Children's Foundation, October 2018

Organizations / Public Service
 Ambassador, Project Lifesaver
 Contributor, Dan Marino Foundation
 Contributor, University of Miami/NSU CARD Tropical Nights
 Board of directors, University of Miami/NSU CARD
 Junior Board Member, Unicorn Children's Foundation
 Associate editor, Zoom Autism Magazine
 Constituency Board, University of Miami/NSU CARD
 Board of directors, Different Brains
 Diversity Committee Co-chair, Miami-Dade Florida Association for Women Lawyers
 Milestones National Autism 2020 Conference Planning Committee

See also
List of first women lawyers and judges in Florida

References

External links
 Official website
 Official Twitter account

1994 births
Living people
21st-century American women artists
Artists with autism
People from Boca Raton, Florida
Writers from Florida
University of Florida alumni
Pine Crest School alumni